was a Japanese architect who predominantly designed government buildings. His most notable works are the Meiji Memorial Picture Gallery and the Hori Shoten building in Tokyo.

Biography
Kobayashi was born in Kioi-cho, Tatemachi-ku, Tokyo. He graduated from the Department of Architecture, Kode School (now Kogakuin University ) in 1909. Kobayashi first worked at the Ministry of Finance building department while attending school. After that, he was an architect at the Interior Ministry and the Ministry of Education, dedicating most of his life to official government buildings. As side projects, in addition to the Hori Shoten commercial building, he also designed residences for Reika Wakatsuki and Enji Bunko.

The Meiji Memorial Picture Gallery was completed on 22 October 1926. Kobayashi's design was chosen from 156 entries in a public design competition held in 1918. His original drawing was modified by Meijijingu Zoeikyoku (building department).

Selected works

  (1911), Exhibited at 2nd Tokyo Kangyo business exhibition
  (1912), Exhibited at the 3rd Tokyo Manga Exhibition
  (1914), in Ueno, Tokyo
  (1918)
The proposal submitted to the design competition (1918) in the name of Toshio Kobo, who is the younger brother, passes through the primary examination, but has become a problem within the Ministry of Finance and has declined. After that, he was said to be involved in the design of the National Assembly building and in charge of the internal design with Toru Yoshitake.
 Blueprints for the Meiji Memorial Picture Gallery (1918)
The Meiji (Seitoku) Memorial Picture Gallery plan draft: 1st prize winner in the design competition (1918). Implementation design of the Meiji Shrine erecting stations Masakazu Kobayashi, Takahashi SadaTaro (1926 completion, Shinjuku-ku, Tokyo Meiji Jingu Outer Gardens).
 Privy Council of Japan building (now the Imperial Palace Guard Headquarters) (1922, Tokyo)
  (now the Otaru Hotel) (1923, Otaru, co-designed with Kenkichi Yabashi)
  (1932, Shinbashi)
Registered tangible cultural property of the country. Collaborative design with his brother Toho Kobo.
 Wakatsuki Reijirō House
  House
 Fumiko Enchi Mansion
 Komuro Suiun House
  House
  (1946, Tokyo)

References

Japanese architects
1890 births
1980 deaths
Imperial Crown Style architecture